Callionymus macclesfieldensis, the Macclesfield dragonet, is a species of dragonet found only on the Macclesfield Bank in the South China Sea where it is found at depths of from .  This species grows to a length of  SL.

References 

M
Fish described in 1983
Taxa named by Ronald Fricke